Cerocephalinae is a parasitic wasp formerly recognized as a subfamily within Pteromalidae, but has recently been promoted to family status.

References

External links 

Taxa named by Charles Joseph Gahan